Joseph Cooper (December 14, 1914 – April 3, 1979) was a Canadian professional ice hockey defenceman who played 414 games in the National Hockey League. Born in Winnipeg, Manitoba, he played for the New York Rangers and Chicago Black Hawks.

Awards and achievements
EAHL First All-Star Team (1935)
CAHL First All-Star Team (1936)
"Honoured Member" of the Manitoba Hockey Hall of Fame

Career statistics

External links

Obituary at LostHockey.com

1914 births
1979 deaths
Canadian ice hockey defencemen
Chicago Blackhawks players
New York Rangers players
Ice hockey people from Winnipeg
Winnipeg Columbus Club players
Canadian expatriate ice hockey players in the United States